William Seymore (born February 29, 1992) is an American soccer midfielder who currently plays for New Mexico United in the USL Championship.

Career

Youth
Seymore spent his youth career in England with Colchester United and Cambridge United Academy along with playing for Cambridgeshire FA county team and England U18 schoolboys. He then joined Soham Town Rangers before signing a letter of intent to play college soccer at Oregon State University.

College
A four-year starter at Oregon State University, he made a total of 73 appearances for the Beavers and tallied seven goals and nine assists. Earning PAC-12 second-team honors, PAC-12 honorable mention and TopDrawerSoccer top 100 freshman list.

He also played in the Premier Development League for Portland Timbers U23s.

Professional
On January 20, 2015, Seymore was drafted in the third round (56th overall) of the 2015 MLS SuperDraft by FC Dallas.  However he was cut from camp and would later join Lane United FC where he made seven appearances.

On July 9, Seymore signed a professional contract with USL club Whitecaps FC 2.  He made his professional debut a week later in a 2–2 draw against Colorado Springs Switchbacks FC.

Following Whitecaps FC 2 folding, Seymore joined FC Cincinnati on November 21, 2017.

Following a successful loan spell at the end of the 2018 season, Seymore joined Reno 1868 permanently on January 10, 2019, where he helped them reach a conference semi-final and finish 2nd in the regular season.

Sligo Rovers
Seymore signed for League of Ireland Premier Division side Sligo Rovers on 9 December 2019.

In a stop-start season, shortened, due to the Covid-19 pandemic, to an 18 game league season, he made 13 appearances in the League, as Sligo finished in fourth place, qualifying for the Europa Conference League. 

Seymore made a further two appearances in the FAI Cup as Sligo reached the semi-final, before losing to eventual runners-up, Shamrock Rovers.

Finn Harps
Seymore signed for Finn Harps ahead of the 2021 League of Ireland Premier Division season.

New Mexico United
On January 2, 2022, Seymore returned to the United States to sign with USL Championship side New Mexico United.

References

External links
Whitecaps FC 2 bio
Oregon State Beavers bio

1992 births
Living people
American soccer players
American expatriate soccer players
American expatriate sportspeople in Ireland
Soham Town Rangers F.C. players
Sportspeople from Cambridgeshire
Oregon State Beavers men's soccer players
Portland Timbers U23s players
Lane United FC players
Whitecaps FC 2 players
FC Cincinnati (2016–18) players
Reno 1868 FC players
Sligo Rovers F.C. players
Finn Harps F.C. players
New Mexico United players
Association football midfielders
Soccer players from Colorado
Expatriate soccer players in Canada
FC Dallas draft picks
USL League Two players
USL Championship players
League of Ireland players
People from Soham
Expatriate association footballers in the Republic of Ireland
American expatriate sportspeople in Canada